Erotelis is a genus of fishes in the family Eleotridae native to the fresh, marine, and brackish coastal waters of the Americas.

Species
The recognized species in this genus are:
 Erotelis armiger (D. S. Jordan & J. A. Richardson, 1895) (flathead sleeper)
 Erotelis clarki (Hildebrand, 1938)
 Erotelis shropshirei (Hildebrand, 1938)
 Erotelis smaragdus (Valenciennes, 1837) (emerald sleeper)

References

Eleotridae